Edward O'Hara (1 October 1937 – 28 May 2016) was a British Labour politician who became Member of Parliament (MP) for Knowsley South following the death of Sean Hughes.

He held the seat from 1990 until 2010 when the constituency was abolished. During this period his seat was considered the safest Labour seat in the country. He was chairman of the committee for technology and aerospace of the Western European Union and was succeeded in 2009 by the German politician Axel Fischer.

O'Hara left the House of Commons in 2010, after being defeated in the selection process to become Labour candidate for the new seat of Knowsley by fellow MP George Howarth.

Early life
O'Hara was born in Bootle, near Liverpool. He was educated at the direct-grant grammar Liverpool Collegiate School, then Magdalen College, Oxford, gaining an MA in Literae Humaniores, and the University of London. Before entering Parliament, Eddie was a councillor in Knowsley and Chair of the Education Committee. 
 
A lifelong loyal Liverpool FC supporter all his life, he taught Latin and Greek at Perse School, Cambridge, and at Birkenhead School before lecturing at C.F. Mott College (became Liverpool Polytechnic) from 1970 to 1975, at the City of Liverpool College of Higher Education from 1975 to 1985, and at Liverpool Polytechnic from 1985 to 1990.

Personal life
He married Lilian Hopkins on 11 September 1962 in Bootle; the couple had two sons and a daughter.

References

External links
 Guardian Unlimited Politics - Ask Aristotle: Edward O'Hara MP
 TheyWorkForYou.com - Edward O'Hara MP

1937 births
2016 deaths
Alumni of Magdalen College, Oxford
Labour Party (UK) MPs for English constituencies
English people of Irish descent
UK MPs 1987–1992
UK MPs 1992–1997
UK MPs 1997–2001
UK MPs 2001–2005
UK MPs 2005–2010
Academics of Liverpool John Moores University
Politicians from Liverpool
Politics of the Metropolitan Borough of Knowsley